Stringtown is an unincorporated community in Pickaway County, in the U.S. state of Ohio.

History
A post office was established at Stringtown in 1866, and remained in operation until 1905. Besides the post office, Stringtown had a country store.

References

Unincorporated communities in Pickaway County, Ohio
Unincorporated communities in Ohio